Norbert Lohfink SJ (born July 28, 1928 in Frankfurt am Main) is a member of the Jesuit Order, German Catholic priest and theologian . He is emeritus professor of exegesis of the Old Testament at the Philosophical-Theological College Sankt Georgen in Frankfurt am Main.
 
Lohfink has been a Jesuit since 1947 and was ordained a priest in 1956. After studying in Munich, Frankfurt, Rome, Paris and Jerusalem he earned the degrees: Lic. Phil. (Munich 1953), Lic. Theol. (Frankfurt 1957), dr. in re biblica (Rome 1962), dr. hc (Vienna 1993). He also taught at the Pontifical Biblical Institute in Rome since 1962 and at the University of St. Georgen in Frankfurt am Main until 1996. His main areas are: Deuteronomic literature, Qoheleth and the Psalms. He is the founder or co-founder of the series "Stuttgarter Bibelstudien" and "Stuttgarter Biblische Aufsatzbände", co-editor of the "Yearbook for Biblical Theology" and the "Zeitschrift für altorientalische und biblische Rechtsgeschichte". His books were translated into many languages. 

Norbert Lohfink is the brother of Gerhard Lohfink. Both belong to the Catholic Integrated Community.

See also 
Hebrew Old Testament Text Project

References

External links 

Literature by and about Norbert Lohfink in the catalog of the German National Library
Biography and Bibliography on the website of the Philosophical-Theological College Sankt Georgen 
 Catholic Integrated Community

20th-century German Catholic theologians
20th-century German Roman Catholic priests
1928 births
Living people
Clergy from Frankfurt
German biblical scholars
Roman Catholic biblical scholars
Old Testament scholars